Asliddin Khabibullaev (born 5 March 1971) is a former Tajikistan international goalkeeper player for Tajikistan, and current manager of FC Khatlon.

Career statistics

International

Statistics accurate as of match played 2 July 2006

Honours

Team
Varzob Dushanbe
Tajikistan Higher League (1): 1999
Tajikistan Cup (1): 1999
Vahsh Qurghonteppa
Tajikistan Higher League (1): 2005
Tajikistan Cup (1): 2003

Individual
Tajik Player of the year (1): 2003

References

1971 births
Living people
Tajikistani footballers
Tajikistan international footballers
Association football goalkeepers